Albertus Christiaan van Raalte (17 October 1811 – 27 July 1876) was a 19th-century Dutch Reformed clergyman.

Early life and education 
Van Raalte did not set out to follow in his father's footsteps and become a clergyman. He was initially attracted to medicine, but he enrolled  in the theological school at the University of Leiden to please his father.  After being spared by cholera, which ravaged the Netherlands, Van Raalte was inspired to devote his life to preaching.

Emigration to America 
Van Raalte was first ordained in the Secession Church in 1836, before moving to the United States, and was eventually ordained in the Reformed Church in America. When he visited the lower peninsula of Michigan, he met with Grand Haven founder William Montague Ferry. Ferry encouraged Van Raalte to settle in the Holland area. He found the area to be what he believed to be ideal for farming, the occupation of many in the Netherlands who were being burdened by high taxes and very little land, so little that farmers could no longer divide their land between their sons as an inheritance. Van Raalte sent home a handbill with such glowing descriptions of the area that many farmers' sons emigrated, cleared the heavily wooded land and found the farming to be fruitful. 

Van Raalte himself was the spiritual leader for the Protestant, Reformed, Dutch immigrants who founded the city of Holland, Michigan in 1846 and played an important role in establishing the school that would become Hope College. 

In addition to settling Holland, Van Raalte also later started a Dutch colony in Amelia Court House, Virginia.

Legacy 
Van Raalte's personal papers are housed at the Heritage Hall Archives of Calvin University.

References

External links
"Heritage Hall"

Further reading
 

1811 births
1876 deaths
People from Steenwijkerland
19th-century Dutch Calvinist and Reformed ministers
Dutch emigrants to the United States
Van Raalte, Albertus
Reformed Church in America ministers
Van Raalte, Albertus
Van Raalte, Albertus
19th-century American clergy